Lickskillet is an extinct town in Putnam County, in the U.S. state of Missouri. The GNIS classifies it as a populated place. 

A variant name was "Mapleton".  A post office called Mapleton was established in 1891, and remained in operation until 1909. The Mapleton School, now defunct, served the area.

References

Ghost towns in Missouri
Former populated places in Putnam County, Missouri